Agrotisia is a genus of moths of the family Noctuidae.

Species
 Agrotisia evelinae Benjamin, 1933
 Agrotisia subhyalina Hampson, 1908
 Agrotisia williamsi (Schaus, 1923)

References
 Agrotisia at Markku Savela's Lepidoptera and Some Other Life Forms
 Natural History Museum Lepidoptera genus database

Acronictinae
Noctuoidea genera